Kasab: The Face of 26/11 is an Indian non-fiction crime novel written by journalist and author Rommel Rodrigues, first published by Penguin Books India in December 2010. The book narrates an exhaustive and in-depth account of events  that culminated in the horrific and heinous 2008 Mumbai attacks that shook the entire world. The savage terror attacks drew global condemnation and were dubbed by several world leaders including Hillary Clinton as 'India's 9/11', a reference to the 2001 September 11 attacks in the United States.

The author Rommel Rodrigues was also the Writer and Associate Director of Ram Gopal Varma's film The Attacks of 26/11 which was released in 2013 to very positive reviews.

Overview
On 26 November 2008 ten heavily armed terrorists entered Mumbai. They headed for the city’s iconic landmarks and the mayhem they unleashed lasted nearly 60 hours. The audacious terror attacks jolted Mumbai like never before. Even as they mourned; the residents of Maximum City demanded answers. But the information they got in return — accounts of the investigation; government rhetoric; newspaper reports; television features; books and even a film released then was sketchy at best. Meanwhile; the courts continued with their prosecution of Mohammed Ajmal Amir Kasab; the lone surviving 26/11 gunman. The broad picture available to the public is of the Pakistan-based terrorist organization Lashkar-e-Taiba and its ringleaders such as Hafiz Muhammad Saeed and Zaki-ur-Rehman Lakhvi training; arming and dispatching ten young men in a boat to attack India’s commercial capital. All we have been told about Kasab is that he was just another recruit brainwashed into carrying out the plot against Mumbai. Kasab: The Face of 26/11 breaks new ground by painstakingly piecing together Kasab’s terror trail. The narrative follows Kasab through the bylanes of Pakistani villages and cities as he made his way towards PoK; the dense forests where the terrorist-training camps are situated; the trains; buses and jeeps he boarded; the Indian vessel he and the others hijacked en route to Mumbai’s shores; Kasab’s capture and incarceration. Rommel Rodrigues’ path-breaking investigative journalism fleshes out for the first time the well thought-out planning and organization that lay behind the attacks of 26/11

References

2010 Indian novels
Indian English-language novels
Indian non-fiction books
Books about the 2008 Mumbai attacks
Indian novels adapted into films
2010 debut novels
Books adapted into films
Books about terrorism
Books about Mumbai
Indian biographies